Lolobau Island is an island in the Bismarck Sea, within the West New Britain Province of the Islands Region, in northern Papua New Guinea.

During World War II a number military actions occurred near Lolobau Island including in early 1943. For example, on May 3, 1943 B-24 Liberator of the United States 5th Air forces attacked shipping near the island.

Lolobau Island is home to the Lolobau Volcano. It is recorded as having erupted in the 20th century.

Geography
It is a volcanic island of the Bismarck Archipelago group. 

It is located just north of New Britain island in the archipelago. Ulawun is an active volcano across the strait from Lolobau Island.

See also
 
 
List of volcanoes in Papua New Guinea

References

External links
Lolobau Island to Willaumez Peninsula, Papua New Guinea, New Britain

Islands of New Britain
Bismarck Archipelago
West New Britain Province